Partenaire Particulier is French pop, electronic, and new wave band from Bordeaux, Nouvelle-Aquitaine. It was successful in France in the mid-1980s. Three of their singles were ranked on the SNEP chart (Top 50), including their signature song "Partenaire Particulier". They stopped releasing records in 1989, although they produced some records in the early 1990s using different pseudonyms.

Discography

Albums
 1986 : Jeux interdits
 1988 : Le Chant des vautours
 1993 : The very best of
 1998 : Collection légende
 2008 : Partenaire Particulier : le son des années 80
 2011 : Geek

Singles
 1985 : "Partenaire Particulier" / "Partenaire Particulier" (instrumental remix) - #3 in France, Gold disc
 1986 : "Je n'oublierai jamais" / "Une Autre Nuit" - #24 in France
 1987 : "Elle est partie" / "Elle n'aimait pas les garçons" - #17 in France
 1987 : "Tiphaine" / "Le Regard fier"
 1988 : "L'Armée" / "Le Rire de Sidonie"
 1989 : "L'Amour à trois" / "Non !"
 2011 : "Effigie" / "Planet B."
 2012 : "Pourrir en enfer" (duet with Angie Doll)

12 inch releases
 1986 : "Tiphaine (Quand tu téléphones)"
 1989 : "L'amour à trois"
 1990 : "Hypnoteck" (using the "DK Dance" pseudonym)
 1990 : "Are friends electric" / "Beside Steel" / "Still beside"
 1990 : "Din Da Dance" (using the "Biz'Art" pseudonym)
 1991 : "It's a lot" (using the "DK Dance" pseudonym)

References

External links
 Official site

1983 establishments in France
1989 disestablishments in France
Musical groups from Bordeaux
Musical groups established in 1983
Musical groups disestablished in 1989